Porthidium volcanicum, the Ujarran hognosed pitviper, is a venomous pitviper species endemic to Costa Rica. No subspecies are currently recognized.

Description

Geographic range
Porthidium volcanicum is known only from the type locality, which is given as "Ujarrás de Buenos Aires (Valle del General, suoeste de la provincia de Puntarenas, Costa Rica)", Volcán de Buenos Aires and Valle del General in Puntarenas Province, Costa Rica.

Habitat
Porthidium volcanicum occurs in tropical moist forest. The region receives  of rainfall annually and has a dry season January–April.

References

Further reading
Solórzano, Alejandro (1994). "Una nueva especie de serpiente terrestre del genero Porthidium (Serpentes: Viperidae), del Suroeste de Costa Rica ". Revista de Biología Tropical 42 (3): 695–701. (Porthidium volcanicum, new species). (in Spanish).

External links
 

volcanicum
Snakes of Central America
Reptiles of Costa Rica
Endemic fauna of Costa Rica
Reptiles described in 1994